{UNCLASSIFIED} is a compilation album released by Adult Swim. The album was released as a free download on their website. It consists of rare and/or unreleased material from various artists.

Track listing
 Ikonika – "World on Mute"
 xxxy – "Kerpow"
 Untold – "Peaky"
 Geiom – "Pure Bristle"
 Ginz – "Chrome"
 Lukid – "Running From The Demons"
 Geeneus ft Riko/Wiley/Breeze – "Knife & Gun" (Dusk & Blackdown 2step mix ft Farrah)
 SBTRKT – "Golddigger"
 Starkey – "Eris"
 Actress – "Murder Plaza"
 Zomby – "Hexagons"
 Dauwd – "Ikopol"
 Boxcutter – "Waiting For The Lights"
 Babe Rainbow ft Ashley Webber – "Give You Time"
 Burial – "Street Halo"
 Kode9 – "Just Inside"
 Pinch – "Blow Out The Candle"
 Cooly G – "R U Listening"

References

Albums free for download by copyright owner
Adult Swim albums
Williams Street Records compilation albums
2011 albums